Awmima Mohamed (born 5 January 1985) is a Sudanese sprinter. She competed in the women's 400 metres at the 2000 Summer Olympics. She was the first woman to represent Sudan at the Olympics.

References

1985 births
Living people
Athletes (track and field) at the 2000 Summer Olympics
Sudanese female sprinters
Olympic athletes of Sudan
Place of birth missing (living people)
Olympic female sprinters
21st-century Sudanese women